The Creighton Sports Complex is a baseball and softball venue located on the campus of Creighton University in Omaha, Nebraska, United States.  It is home to the softball team, members of the NCAA Division I Big East Conference, and former home of the Creighton University baseball team.  The baseball team moved to TD Ameritrade Park Omaha in 2011.  The facility opened in 1988 and has a capacity of 2,000 at the baseball diamond and 1,000 at the softball diamond.  Both fields are surfaced with synthetic turf.

Layout
The facility contains both a baseball and softball diamond.  A photo of the facility is available here.  Also part of the facility is the Kitty Gaughan Pavilion, which contains offices and indoor training areas for both sports, as well as additional facilities for other Creighton sports.

See also
 List of NCAA Division I baseball venues

References

College baseball venues in the United States
Baseball venues in Nebraska
Sports venues in Omaha, Nebraska
Creighton Bluejays baseball
1998 establishments in Nebraska
Sports venues completed in 1998
College softball venues in the United States
Creighton Bluejays softball